Irene Doris "Dot" Laughton (29 September 1913 – 8 March 1982) was a top-ranking sportswoman in South Australia representing Australia and South Australia in cricket and field hockey during the 1930s until retirement in 1953.

In Cricket, Laughton scored 40 centuries in first class cricket domestically and made the world-record score of 390 in 1949. A State captain, she was selected for Australia tour to England in 1951 where she scored 47 runs from her only appearance. An award 'The Dot Laughton Trophy' is awarded to outstanding South Australian women cricketers.

In field hockey, she was selected as left-full back for Australia in 1947 in a series versus New Zealand.

References

External links
 

Australian women cricketers
1913 births
1982 deaths
Australia women Test cricketers
Cricketers from Adelaide
Australian female field hockey players
Field hockey players from Adelaide
Sportswomen from South Australia
Wicket-keepers
Female field hockey defenders